David Patrick Seitz (born March 17, 1978) is an American voice actor, ADR director and script writer known for his work for Funimation, Bang Zoom! Entertainment, NYAV Post, Studiopolis, Viz Media, Disney/Pixar, New Generation Pictures and Riot Games. He has provided voices for English versions of Japanese anime and video games, including over 100 projects since his initial foray into the voice-over industry in 2000 with the Amazing Nurse Nanako OVA.

Biography 
Seitz began acting in plays at the age of fourteen when he tried out for and got into The King and I. He continued doing theater through high school and took acting and singing lessons.  Prior to his current level of involvement in the voice-over industry, he taught English studies at his high school alma mater and received a Bachelor of Arts in Creative Writing, Master of Fine Arts in Creative and the Performing Arts Writing (both from UC Riverside).

Career 
Seitz's video game roles include Eternal Sonata, Mortal Kombat, Castlevania, BlazBlue, League of Legends, Xenoblade Chronicles X, Octopath Traveler, Fire Emblem Three Houses, Skullgirls, Tekken and Ys. On the other side of the mic, Seitz adapted and directed the English dubs of Girls Bravo, Kamichu, Tales of Phantasia OVA, and Carole & Tuesday, in addition to adapting over 100 episodes of other series, including Aggretsuko, Zegapain, Hell Girl, and Romeo x Juliet.

Filmography

Anime

Animation

Films

Video games

References

External links
 
 
 
 Patrick Seitz at the CrystalAcids Anime Voice Actor Database
 
 Patrick Seitz at FanCons.com

1978 births
Living people
21st-century American male actors
American male stage actors
American male voice actors
American male video game actors
American male screenwriters
American male television writers
American television writers
American casting directors
American voice directors
American people of German descent
Disney people
Funimation
Pixar people
Place of birth missing (living people)
University of California, Riverside alumni